The 1965 New Jersey State Senate elections were held on November 2.

The elections were the first held after the Supreme Court's Reynolds v. Sims decision, which held that New Jersey's single-seat county apportionment was unconstitutional. The ruling forced New Jersey to grant multiple seats to its largest counties (and eventually, switch to single-member districts that did not follow county lines).

The election also coincided with a landslide re-election victory for Democratic Governor Richard J. Hughes.

The result was a majority for the Democratic Party, the first since 1915.

Background

Reapportioning 

Until 1965, the New Jersey State Senate was composed of 21 senators, with each county electing one senator. After the U.S. Supreme Court decision Reynolds v. Sims required legislative districts to be approximately equal in population (a principle known as "one man, one vote"), New Jersey entered a decade-long period of reapportionment.

The overall effect of the reapportioning was to reduce representation for rural counties and increase representation for more populous urban counties, bringing the per person population closer to parity.

In 1965, the Senate was increased to 29 members, with larger counties given multiple seats and some smaller counties sharing one or two Senators:

Incumbents not running for re-election

Democratic 
 Robert H. Weber (District 2) (managed John Waddington's campaign)

Republican 
 Charles W. Sandman (District 1) (ran for Governor)
 W. Steelman Mathis (District 5)
 Wayne Dumont (District 10) (ran for Governor)

Summary of results by State Senate District

District 1

District 2

District 3

District 4

District 5

District 6

District 7

District 8

District 9

District 10

District 11

District 12

District 13

District 14

References 

1965 New Jersey elections
New Jersey
1965